Yazdani or Yezdani may refer to:

 Yazdani (surname)
 Demonym of people from Yazd or Yazdan
 Follower of the assumed pre-Islamic Kurdish religion Yazdânism
 Yazdani Bakery, Irani cafe or Persian style bakery in Mumbai, India

See also 
 Yazdan (disambiguation)
 Abbas Yazdani, village in Iran
 Chah-e Mohammadabad Yazdani, village in Iran
 Mazraeh-ye Yezdani, Golestan, village in Iran